Julien Berjeaut, known as Jul, (born April 11, 1974), is a French cartoonist and comic book author. Jul most famous creation is Silex and the City.

Awards

2012 Ordre des Arts et des Lettres
2016 Ordre des Arts et des Lettres

References 

1974 births
French comics writers
French comics artists
French humorists
Officiers of the Ordre des Arts et des Lettres
Charlie Hebdo people
French editorial cartoonists
French cartoonists
French caricaturists
Living people